Sir Charles George Douglas Roberts  (January 10, 1860 – November 26, 1943) was a Canadian poet and prose writer. He was one of the first Canadian authors to be internationally known. He published various works on Canadian exploration and natural history, verse, travel books, and fiction."
He continued to be a well-known "man of letters" until his death.

Besides his own body of work, Roberts has also been called the "Father of Canadian Poetry" because he served as an inspiration and a source of assistance for other Canadian poets of his time.

Roberts, his cousin Bliss Carman, Archibald Lampman and Duncan Campbell Scott are known as the Confederation Poets. He also inspired a whole nationalist school of late 19th-century poets.

Early life and education
Roberts was born in Douglas, New Brunswick in 1860, the eldest child of Emma Wetmore Bliss and Rev. George Goodridge Roberts (an Anglican priest). Rev. Roberts was rector of Fredericton and canon of Christ Church Cathedral, New Brunswick. Charles's brother Theodore Goodridge Roberts and sister, Elizabeth Roberts MacDonald, also became authors.

Between the ages of 8 months and 14 years, Roberts was raised in the parish of Westcock, New Brunswick, near Sackville, by the Tantramar Marshes. He was homeschooled, mostly by his father, who was educated in Greek, Latin and French. He published his first writing, three articles in The Colonial Farmer, at 12 years of age.

After the family moved to Fredericton in 1873, Roberts attended Fredericton Collegiate School from 1874 to 1876, and then the University of New Brunswick (UNB), earning his  B.A. in 1879 and M.A. in 1881. At the Collegiate School he came under the influence of headmaster George Robert Parkin, who gave him a love of classical literature and introduced him to the poetry of Dante Gabriel Rossetti and Algernon Charles Swinburne.

Early Canadian career

Roberts worked as principal of Chatham High School in Chatham, New Brunswick, from 1879 to 1881, and of York Street School in Fredericton from 1881 to 1883. In Chatham he met and befriended Edmund Collins, editor of the Chatham Star and the future biographer of Sir John A. Macdonald.

Roberts first published poetry in the Canadian Illustrated News of March 30, 1878, and by 1879 he had placed two poems in the American magazine, Scribner's.

In 1880, Roberts published his first book of poetry, Orion and Other Poems. Thanks in part to his industry in sending out complimentary review copies, there were many positive reviews, including praise from Rose-Belford's Canadian Monthly and several American periodicals, including the New York Independent, which called it 'a little book of choice things, with the indifferent things well weeded out.'"

On December 29, 1880, Roberts married Mary Fenety, and they had five children.

The biography by Roberts's friend Edmund Collins, The Life and Times of Sir John A. Macdonald, was published in 1883. The book was a success, going through eight printings. It contained a chapter on "Thought and Literature in Canada," which devoted 15 pages to Roberts, quoting from Orion. Collins' characterization of Roberts as "our greatest Canadian poet" helped develop Roberts' reputation as a prominent Canadian writer.

From 1883 to 1884, Roberts was in Toronto, Ontario, working as the editor of Goldwin Smith's short-lived literary magazine, The Week. After five months of long hours and disagreements with Smith, Roberts resigned.

In 1885, Roberts became a professor at the University of King's College in Windsor, Nova Scotia. In 1886, his second book, In Divers Tones, was published by a Boston publisher. During the following six years, Roberts wrote articles on a variety of subjects, and lectured in a number of cities in Canada and the United States.  He published about thirty poems in The Independent (edited by Bliss Carman) and other American periodicals, as well as stories for young readers in The Youth's Companion. He also edited a poetry collection, Poems of Wild Life in 1888, and created the Canadian Guide Book in 1891.

The anthology, Songs of the Great Dominion,  edited by W.D. Lighthall, included a selection of Roberts's work.

Roberts resigned from King's College in 1895, when his request for a leave of absence was turned down. In a short period of time he had published his first novel, The Forge in the Forest, as well as a fourth collection of poetry, The Book of the Native.  He also wrote a book of nature-stories, Earth's Enigmas, and completed a book of boys' adventure stories Around the Campfire.

Move to New York

In 1897, Roberts left his wife and children in Canada and moved to New York City to work free-lance. Between 1897 and 1898, he worked for The Illustrated American as an associate editor.

In New York, Roberts wrote prose in many genres, but had most success with animal stories, drawing upon his early experience in the wilds of the Maritimes. He published about a dozen volumes of these, beginning with Earth's Enigmas in 1896 and ending with Eyes of the Wilderness in 1933.

Roberts also wrote historical romances and novels. Barbara Ladd (1902) is the story of a young girl who runs away from her aunt in New England in 1769; it sold 80,000 copies in the US. He also wrote descriptive text for guide books, such as Picturesque Canada and The Land of Evangeline and Gateways Thither for Nova Scotia's Dominion Atlantic Railway.

Roberts became involved in a literary debate known as the nature fakers controversy after John Burroughs denounced his popular animal stories, and those of other writers, in a 1903 article for Atlantic Monthly. The controversy lasted for nearly six years and included American environmental and political figures of the day, including President Theodore Roosevelt.

Europe and return to Canada
In 1907, Roberts moved to Europe. First living in Paris, he moved to Munich in 1910, and in 1912 to London, where he lived until 1925. During his stay in London, Roberts wrote a series of short stories about dinosaurs and prehistoric humans. These stories were later collected as the 1919 book In the Morning of Time. In Britain he became a member of Legion of Frontiersmen. During World War I he enlisted with the British Army as a trooper, eventually becoming a captain and a cadet trainer in England. After the war he joined the Canadian War Records Office in London.

Roberts returned to Canada in 1925 and began once more to write poetry." During the late 1920s he was a member of the Halifax literary and social set, The Song Fishermen.

He married his second wife Joan Montgomery on October 28, 1943, at the age of 83, but became ill and died shortly thereafter in Toronto. The funeral was held in Toronto; his ashes were interred in Forest Hill Cemetery, Fredericton.

Poetry

Early work
Roberts's first book, Orion and Other Poems (1880), was a collection of poetry written in his teen years.  It was a vanity book; he paid an advance of $300 to have it published, borrowing money from George E. Fenety, the Queen's Printer for New Brunswick, and his father-in-law-to-be. Much later, in 1958, the critic Desmond Pacey deemed it a "remarkable performance" considering the age of the writer. Editor Ross Kilpatrick called the poems "imitative, naively romantic, defective in diction", but also "facile, clever, and occasionally distinctly beautiful".

Roberts' second book, In Divers Tones is filled with selections which vary in quality, style and subject. Those written after 1883 demonstrated developing skill, and three in particular,  'The Tantramar Revisited,' 'The Sower,' and 'The Potato Harvest, were considered superior.

By the time of Songs of the Common Day, and Ave! (1893), Roberts poetic style was well developed. The sonnet sequence of Songs of the Common Day drew attention from critics; some colourfully described landscapes in Tantramar (lines such as "How sombre slope these acres to the sea' ('The Furrow"), 'These marshes pale and meadows by the sea' ('The Salt Flats'), and 'My fields of Tantramar in summer-time' ('The Pea-Fields')).

Middle period
After Roberts turned to free-lance writing in 1895, he began concentrating on writing fiction in order to support himself. He published two more books of poetry by 1898, but managed only two more in the following 30 years.

His 1897 book of seasonal poems in The Book of the Native was a collection of works designed to appeal to monthly magazines: 'The Brook in February,' 'An April Adoration,' 'July,' and 'An August Woodroad.' Some of the poems demonstrated Roberts' skill at colourful depictions of nature through Romantic verse; however, the book also included examples of a shift toward a more mystical style.

Roberts's 1898 book New York Nocturnes and Other Poems was filled mainly with poetry written before his move to New York.  Written during a difficult time in his life, much of the work is unremarkable.  The poem 'The Solitary Woodsman,' was later included in a number of anthologies.   His poems about New York focus less on descriptions of visual interest and more on urban problems such as  noise, fumes and crowding.

The first and title section of The Book of the Rose (1903) was a collection of love poetry of varying effectiveness.  Among the poems in the second section,  "Heat in the City," about the distress and despair of the tenement-dwellers, has been praised as "the best poem he ever wrote about city life". Also notable is the introspective final poem in the book, "The Aim."

"New Poems, a slim volume published in 1919, shows the drop in both the quantity and quality of  Roberts' poetry during his European years. At least half of the pieces had been written before he left America, some as early as 1903."

Later poems
Roberts's "return to Canada in 1925 led to a renewed production of verse with The Vagrant of Time (1927) and The Iceberg and Other Poems (1934)." Literary critic Desmond Pacey calls this period "the Indian summer of his poetic career".

"Among the best of the new poems" in The Vagrant of Time "is the one with this inspired opening line: 'Spring breaks in foam along the blackthorn bough.'
In another love poem, 'In the Night Watches,' written in 1926, his command of free verse is natural and unstrained, unlike the laboured language and forced rhymes of his earlier love poetry. Its synthesis of lonely wilderness setting with feelings of separation and longing is harmonious and poignant."

"Most critics rank "The Iceberg" (265 lines), the title poem of the new collection" published in 1934, "as one of Roberts' outstanding achievements. It is almost as ambitious as 'Ave!' in conception; its cold, unemotional images are as apt and precise in their detached way as the warmly-remembered descriptions in 'Tantramar Revisited.'

Animal stories
The Canadian Encyclopedia says that "Roberts is remembered for creating in the animal story, along with Ernest Thompson Seton, the one native Canadian art form." A typical Roberts animal story is "The Truce". Many of Roberts' stories are told from the point of view of the animals themselves.

In his introduction to The Kindred of the Wild (1902), Roberts called  the animal story  "a potent emancipator. It frees us for a little from the world of shop-worn utilities, and from the mean tenement of self of which we do well to grow weary. It helps us to return to nature, without requiring that we at the same time return to barbarism. It leads us back to the old kinship of earth, without asking us to relinquish by way of toll any part of the wisdom of the ages, any fine essential of the 'large result of time.' (Kindred 28)"

Critics began to take interest in Roberts's animal stories in the 1960s and 70s. Some critics saw the animal stories as an allegory for Canadian nationhood, seeing in Seton's and Roberts' depictions of the brutal lives of animals a reflection of Canada's fate in dealing with the United States.

Margaret Atwood devotes a chapter of her 1971 critical study Survival: A Thematic Guide to Canadian Literature to animal stories, where she states the same thesis: "the stories are told from the point of view of the animal. That's the key: English animal stories are about the 'social relations,' American ones are about people killing animals; Canadian ones are about animals being killed, as felt emotionally from inside the fur and feathers. (qtd. in Sandlos 74; emphasis in original)."

Recognition
Charles G. D Roberts was elected a Fellow of the Royal Society of Canada in 1893.

Roberts was elected to the United States National Institute of Arts and Letters in 1898.

He was awarded an honorary LLD from UNB in 1906, and an honorary doctorate from Mount Allison University in 1942.

For his contributions to Canadian literature, Roberts was awarded the Royal Society of Canada's first Lorne Pierce Medal in 1926.

On June 3, 1935, Roberts was one of three Canadians on King George V's honour list to receive a knighthood (Knight Commander of the Order of St. Michael and St. George).

Roberts was honoured by a sculpture erected in 1947 on the UNB campus, portraying him with Bliss Carman and fellow poet Francis Joseph Sherman.

The 1980s were a period of renewed interest in Roberts' work: a number of monographs were written; a book containing all his poems, a biography, and a collection of his letters were published.Mount Allison University hosted a Roberts Symposium in 1982, as did the University of Ottawa in 1983. There were several new studies of his poetry.

Roberts was declared a Person of National Historic Significance in 1945, and a monument to him was erected by the Historic Sites and Monuments Board of Canada in Westcock in 2005.

His alma mater, the University of New Brunswick, offers a "Charles G.D. Roberts Memorial Prize" for best short story by an undergraduate.

Roberts' poem "The Maple" was set to music by composer Garrett Krause, and performed in 2018 as part of the Luminous Voices concert in Calgary.

Publications

Poetry
 ; also: ; 
 ; also: ; 
AVE! An Ode for the Shelley Centenary. Toronto: Williamson, 1892.
 ; 
 
 
Poems. New York: Silver, Burdett, 1901.
 ; 
 
 ; 
 ;

Fiction
 ; 
 ; 
 
 ; 
 
 
 
 
 
 
 
 ; 
 
  (Illustrated by Julek Heller in 1976)
 
 
 
 
 
 
 
 
 
 
 
 
 
 
 
 
 
 
 
 
  (digital copy at HathiTrust) – 1912 magazine stories, extended; with eight illustrations by seven artists

Non-fiction
 
 
 
Canada in Flanders (1918) –  non-fiction

Edited
Poems of Wild Life. London: W. Scott, 1888.
Canada Speaks of Britain and Other Poems of the War. Toronto: Ryerson, 1941.

Papers
 Sir Charles G. D. Roberts papers.	Charles George Douglas Roberts; Linda Dumbleton; Rose Mary Gibson. Kingston : Queen's University Archives, {c.1983}.
 The Collected Letters of Sir Charles G.D. Roberts. Fredericton, NB: Goose Lane, 1989.

See also

 Canadian literature
 Canadian poetry
 List of Canadian poets
 William Harris Lloyd Roberts

Notes

Citations

Further reading
 
 Adams, John Coldwell, Sir Charles God Damn: The Life of Sir Charles G.D. Roberts, University of Toronto Press, 1986.
 Scobie, Charles H.H., Roberts Country: Sir Charles G. D Roberts and the Tantramar, Tantramar Heritage Trust, 2008.

External links
 

 
 
 
 
 Poetry Online: Charles G.D. Roberts
 Archives of the Roberts family
 

1860 births
1943 deaths
19th-century Canadian poets
20th-century Canadian poets
19th-century Canadian novelists
20th-century Canadian novelists
Canadian Anglicans
Canadian Knights Commander of the Order of St Michael and St George
British Army personnel of World War I
Canadian male novelists
Canadian people of Welsh descent
Canadian male short story writers
Canadian World War I poets
20th-century Canadian male writers
Canadian male poets
Fellows of the Royal Society of Canada
Legion of Frontiersmen members
Persons of National Historic Significance (Canada)
People from Sackville, New Brunswick
People from York County, New Brunswick
Sonneteers
University of New Brunswick alumni
Writers from New Brunswick
British Army soldiers
King's Regiment (Liverpool) officers
20th-century Canadian short story writers
19th-century Canadian short story writers
19th-century male writers
Canadian historical novelists
Writers of fiction set in prehistoric times